Shikengkong is a mountain located between Yangshan County and Ruyuan Yao Autonomous County in northern Guangdong, China.

References 

Mountains of Guangdong
Highest points of Chinese provinces